A headshell is a head piece designed to be attached to the end of a turntable's or record player's tonearm, which holds the cartridge. Standard catridges are secured to the headshell by a couple of 2.5 mm bolts spaced 1/2" apart.

Some headshells are designed to allow variable weights to be attached. For example, the H4-S Stanton headshell comes with 2g and 4g screw-in weights. Extra weight can be useful to prevent skipping if the DJ is scratching the record.

H-4 Bayonet Mount
Most headshells use a standard H-4 Bayonet Mount, which will fit all S shape tonearms. The bayonet has a standard barrel whose dimensions are 8 mm diameter and 12 mm length, with its four pins connected to the four colour-coded head-shell lead wires.

Headshell lead wires colours

The colour standards for the contact connections are as follows:

White: Left channel cartridge positive.
Blue: Left channel cartridge negative.
Red: Right channel cartridge positive.
Green: Right channel cartridge negative.

References

Audio engineering